Sulakhan (also Romanized as Sūlākhān) is a village in Arabkhaneh Rural District, Shusef District, Nehbandan County, South Khorasan Province, Iran. At the 2016 census, its population was 73, in 27 families.

References 

Populated places in Nehbandan County